Allentown is an unincorporated community in Allen County, in the U.S. state of Ohio.

History
Allentown was platted in 1835. A post office called Allentown was established in 1848, and remained in operation until 1904.

References

Unincorporated communities in Allen County, Ohio
1835 establishments in Ohio
Populated places established in 1835
Unincorporated communities in Ohio